Mindflex is a toy by Mattel by which a child uses their brain waves to steer a ball through an obstacle course. Brain waves are registered by the enclosed EEG headset, which allows the child to control an air stream by concentrating, thus lifting or lowering a foam ball.  The game was released in the fall of 2009, and uses the same microchip as the MindSet from NeuroSky and homebuilt EEG machines.

Controversy 
Despite the science behind the technology developed by Mattel, outside scientists have questioned whether the toy actually measures brain waves or just randomly moves the ball, exploiting the well-known illusion of control. However, despite the Spiegel/Haynes experiments, supporters of the game stand behind the research that went into the development of Mindflex, and believe that the headset does indeed read EEGs.

See also
 Comparison of consumer brain-computer interface devices
 Brain-Computer Interface

References

External links
 http://www.bbc.com/future/story/20151026-a-teens-mind-controlled-arm-could-make-prosthetics-cheaper

Electroencephalography
Electronic toys
2010s toys
Mattel